Jan Petrus Hoffman (born 1 May 1988) is a South African male shot putter who won two individual gold medal at the Youth World Championships.

References

External links

1988 births
Living people
South African male shot putters